Sulsula is a genus of spiders in the family Oonopidae. It was first described in 1882 by Simon. , it contains only one species, Sulsula pauper, found in Algeria, Egypt, and Sudan.

References

Oonopidae
Monotypic Araneomorphae genera
Spiders of Africa